Aindrias Moynihan (born 17 October 1967) is an Irish Fianna Fáil politician who has been a Teachta Dála (TD) for the Cork North-West constituency since the 2016 general election.

Cork County Council 
He was a member of Cork County Council for the Blarney-Macroom local electoral area from 2003 to 2016.

Dáil Éireann 
Moynihan was elected been as a Teachta Dála (TD) for the Cork North-West constituency in the 2016 general election.

He is the son of Donal Moynihan who was also a TD.

References

External links
Aindrias Moynihan's page on the Fianna Fáil website

 

1967 births
Living people
Members of the 32nd Dáil
Members of the 33rd Dáil
Fianna Fáil TDs
Local councillors in County Cork
People from Macroom
Alumni of Cork Institute of Technology
Alumni of University College Cork